Gary Francis Green (born October 2, 1955) is a former American football cornerback. A star at Baylor, he played nine professional seasons as a cornerback from 1977-1985 in the National Football League (NFL) and intercepted 33 passes over the course of his career.  Green was selected to 4 Pro Bowls and five All-Pro Teams during his career. He was inducted into the Kansas City Chiefs Ring of Honor January 3, 2016

1955 births
Living people
Players of American football from San Antonio
African-American players of American football
All-American college football players
American Conference Pro Bowl players
American football cornerbacks
Baylor Bears football players
Kansas City Chiefs players
Los Angeles Rams players
National Conference Pro Bowl players
21st-century African-American people
20th-century African-American sportspeople